Juan Cruz Álvarez (born November 20, 1985 in Arrecifes, Argentina) is a race car driver.

Career
Álvarez was the World Series Lights champion in 2003, driving for the Meycom team.  He moved up to the World Series by Nissan for 2004.  In 2005 he drove in the inaugural GP2 Series season for Campos Racing, scoring 4.5 points overall.

He was not retained for 2006, and did not race during this year.  For 2007 he moved back to Argentina, competing in the Top Race V6 championship.  He continues in the series for 2008.  He has also driven in one race of the TC 2000 series, in 2007.

Racing record

Complete GP2 Series results
(key) (Races in bold indicate pole position) (Races in italics indicate fastest lap)

References
Career statistics from driverdb.com, retrieved on July 6, 2008.

External links
Official Site

1985 births
Living people
Argentine racing drivers
People from Arrecifes
International Formula 3000 drivers
GP2 Series drivers
TC 2000 Championship drivers
Top Race V6 drivers
International GT Open drivers
Formula Renault Argentina drivers
Súper TC 2000 drivers
Sportspeople from Buenos Aires Province

Drivex drivers
Campos Racing drivers
Teo Martín Motorsport drivers
24H Series drivers